The 2021–22 OHL season was the 42nd season of operation (41st season of play) of the Ontario Hockey League. After the 2020–21 OHL season was cancelled due to the COVID-19 pandemic, the league played a full 68-game regular season having begun on October 7, 2021, and concluded on April 17, 2022. The post-season began on April 21, 2022 and concluded on June 15, 2022.

The Hamilton Bulldogs won the J. Ross Robertson Cup and advanced to the 2022 Memorial Cup final, to face the host team Saint John Sea Dogs of the QMJHL at TD Station in Saint John, New Brunswick.

Broadcast rights
On July 21, 2021, the CHL announced a new multi-year broadcast rights partnership with TSN, RDS and the CBC beginning in the 2021-22 season. The new partnership includes approximately 30 regular season games each year delivered by TSN, approximately 20 French-language broadcast games on RDS, early season weekend games broadcast by CBC Sports, as well as digital streaming rights featuring a CHL TV broadcast each week during the regular season on TSN, RDS, and the CBC Gem streaming service.

Hamilton Outdoor Showcase
On March 14, 2022, the Hamilton Bulldogs hosted the Hamilton Outdoor Showcase at Tim Hortons Field against the their East Division rivals, the Oshawa Generals. The Bulldogs shutout the Generals 3-0 in front of 12,587 fans. This marked the fourth outdoor game in OHL history and was the first time since 2017 that the league hosted an outdoor game.

Regular season

Final standings

Note: DIV = Division; GP = Games played; W = Wins; L = Losses; OTL = Overtime losses; SL = Shootout losses; GF = Goals for; GA = Goals against;  PTS = Points; x = clinched playoff berth; y = clinched division title; z = clinched conference title

Eastern conference

Western conference

Scoring leaders
Note: GP = Games played; G = Goals; A = Assists; Pts = Points; PIM = Penalty minutes

Leading goaltenders
Note: GP = Games played; Mins = Minutes played; W = Wins; L = Losses: OTL = Overtime losses;  SL = Shootout losses; GA = Goals Allowed; SO = Shutouts; GAA = Goals against average

Playoffs

Conference quarterfinals

Eastern conference quarterfinals

(1) Hamilton Bulldogs vs. (8) Peterborough Petes

(2) North Bay Battalion vs. (7) Ottawa 67's

(3) Kingston Frontenacs vs. (6) Oshawa Generals

(4) Mississauga Steelheads vs. (5) Barrie Colts

Western conference quarterfinals

(1) Windsor Spitfires vs. (8) Sarnia Sting

(2) London Knights vs. (7) Kitchener Rangers

(3) Flint Firebirds vs. (6) Owen Sound Attack

(4) Sault Ste. Marie Greyhounds vs. (5) Guelph Storm

Conference semifinals

Eastern conference semifinals

(1) Hamilton Bulldogs vs. (4) Mississauga Steelheads

(2) North Bay Battalion vs. (3) Kingston Frontenacs

Western conference semifinals

(1) Windsor Spitfires vs. (7) Kitchener Rangers

(3) Flint Firebirds vs. (4) Sault Ste. Marie Greyhounds

Conference finals

Eastern Conference finals

(1) Hamilton Bulldogs vs. (2) North Bay Battalion

Western Conference finals

(1) Windsor Spitfires vs. (3) Flint Firebirds

J. Ross Robertson Cup finals
Game 7 set a league record-breaking attendance of 11,779 at the FirstOntario Centre.

(E1) Hamilton Bulldogs vs. (W1) Windsor Spitfires

J. Ross Robertson Cup Champions Roster

Playoff scoring leaders
Note: GP = Games played; G = Goals; A = Assists; Pts = Points; PIM = Penalty minutes

Playoff leading goaltenders
Note: GP = Games played; Mins = Minutes played; W = Wins; L = Losses: OTL = Overtime losses;  SL = Shootout losses; GA = Goals Allowed; SO = Shutouts; GAA = Goals against average

Awards

All-Star teams
The OHL All-Star Teams were selected by the OHL's General Managers.

First team
Wyatt Johnston, Centre, Windsor Spitfires
Brennan Othmann, Left Wing, Flint Firebirds
Brandon Coe, Right Wing, North Bay Battalion
Nathan Staios, Defence, Hamilton Bulldogs
Ryan O'Rourke, Defence, Sault Ste. Marie Greyhounds
Brett Brochu, Goaltender, London Knights
James Richmond, Coach, Mississauga Steelheads

Second team
Mason McTavish, Centre, Peterborough Petes/Hamilton Bulldogs
Will Cuylle, Left Wing, Windsor Spitfires
Luke Evangelista, Right Wing, London Knights
Jack Thompson, Defence, Sudbury Wolves/Sault Ste. Marie Greyhounds
Brandt Clarke, Defence, Barrie Colts
Luke Cavallin, Goaltender, Flint Firebirds
Ted Dent, Coach, Flint Firebirds

Third team
Shane Wright, Centre, Kingston Frontenacs
Tye Kartye, Left Wing, Sault Ste. Marie Greyhounds
Lucas Edmonds, Right Wing, Kingston Frontenacs
Arber Xhekaj, Defence, Kitchener Rangers/Hamilton Bulldogs
Pavel Mintyukov, Defence, Saginaw Spirit
Marco Costantini, Goaltender, Hamilton Bulldogs
Jay McKee, Coach, Hamilton Bulldogs

First All-Rookie team
Calum Ritchie, Centre, Oshawa Generals
Colby Barlow, Left Wing, Owen Sound Attack
Coulson Pitre, Right Wing, Flint Firebirds
Cam Allen, Defence, Guelph Storm
Michael Buchinger, Defence, Guelph Storm
Nolan Lalonde, Goaltender, Erie Otters

Second All-Rookie team
Owen Beck, Centre, Mississauga Steelheads
Quentin Musty, Left Wing, Sudbury Wolves
Vinzenz Rohrer, Right Wing, Ottawa 67's
Ty Nelson, Defence, North Bay Battalion
Beau Akey, Defence, Barrie Colts
Luke Cavallin, Goaltender, Flint Firebirds
Dom DiVincentiis, Coach, North Bay Battalion

2022 OHL Priority Selection
On April 20, 2022, the league announced the results of their first-ever Ontario Hockey League Priority Selection Draft Lottery. The Saginaw Spirit won the lottery  and selected Michael Misa from the Mississauga Senators of the GTHL. The entirety of the OHL Priority Selection Draft will take place over two days, as rounds 1-3 take place on April 29, while rounds 4-15 will be on April 30.

These are the results for the first round of the draft:

2022 CHL Import Draft
On July 1, 2022, the Canadian Hockey League conducted the 2022 CHL Import Draft, in which teams in all three CHL leagues participate in. The Saginaw Spirit held the first pick in the draft by a team in the OHL. The Spirit selected Martin Misiak from Slovakia with the OHL's first selection in the draft.

Below are the players who were selected in the first round by Ontario Hockey League teams in the 2022 CHL Import Draft.

2022 NHL Entry Draft
On July 7–8, 2022, the National Hockey League conducted the 2022 NHL Entry Draft at the Bell Centre in Montreal, Quebec. Shane Wright of the Kingston Frontenacs was the highest player from the OHL to be selected, as he was taken with the fourth overall pick by the Seattle Kraken. A total of 35 players were drafted from the OHL.

Below are the players selected from OHL teams at the NHL Entry Draft.

Kubota CHL/NHL Top Prospects Game
The Kubota CHL/NHL Top Prospects Game is an annual event in which forty of the top NHL Entry Draft eligible prospects in the Canadian Hockey League play against each other in an all-star game format. The 2021-22 Kubota CHL/NHL Top Prospects Game was held at the Kitchener Memorial Auditorium in Kitchener, Ontario. Eighteen players from the OHL participated in the event.

Team Red
Team Red was coached by Jamie McLennan, who is a co-host of the radio show OverDrive and a former NHL goaltender. His assistant coaches were his OverDrive co-host Bryan Hayes, Kitchener Rangers head coach Mike McKenzie and Derek Roy, who was the Rangers captain when they won the 2003 Memorial Cup, before moving on to the NHL.

Ten players from the OHL were named to the Team Red roster. The players included were Luca Del Bel Belluz, Mississauga Steelheads; Michael Buchinger, Guelph Storm; Jorian Donovan, Hamilton Bulldogs; Isaiah George, London Knights; David Goyette, Sudbury Wolves; Hunter Haight, Barrie Colts; Ty Nelson, North Bay Battalion; Matthew Poitras, Guelph Storm; Shane Wright, Kingston Frontenacs; and Danny Zhilkin, Guelph Storm. Wright was named captain of the team.

During the game, Wright scored the opening goal of the game 3:43 into the first period, as Zhilkin earned an assist. This would be the only goal of the game for Team Red, as they lost the game 3-1. Wright was named Team Red player of the game.

Team White
Team White was coached by former Guelph Storm and NHL player Jeff O'Neill, who is a co-host of the radio show OverDrive. His assistant coaches were Guelph Storm head coach George Burnett, former Ottawa 67's head coach Brian Kilrea, Leafs Lunch radio show host Michael Distefano, and former Ottawa 67's assistant coach Bert O'Brien.

Eight players from the OHL were named to the roster. The players included were Owen Beck, Mississauga Steelheads; Ruslan Gazizov, London Knights; Jake Karabela, Guelph Storm; Paul Ludwinski, Kingston Frontenacs; Bryce McConnell-Barker, Sault Ste. Marie Greyhounds; Pavel Mintyukov, Saginaw Spirit; Vinzenz Rohrer, Ottawa 67's; and Matyas Sapovaliv, Saginaw Spirit.

Karabela scored a goal and earned an assist for the White Team in a 3-1 victory.

Game Summary
Shane Wright of the Kingston Frontenacs opened the scoring for Team Red at 3:43 into the first period, as Danny Zhilkin of the Guelph Storm and Matthew Seminoff of the Kamloops Blazers earned assists for an early 1-0 lead. Team White tied the game midway through the period as Jagger Firkus of the Moose Jaw Warriors scored at 13:44. Jake Karabela of the Guelph Storm earned the lone assist on the goal. Team White outshot Team Red 12-4 in the period.

In the second period, Team White took a 2-1 lead, as Jake Karabela of the Guelph Storm scored, as Jagger Firkus of the Moose Jaw Warriors earned the assist, giving both players two points in the game, 5:20 into the period. Just over three minutes later, at 8:23, Nathan Gaucher of the Quebec Remparts scored to give Team White a 3-1 lead, as Antonin Verreault of the Gatineau Olympiques and Denton Mateychuk of the Moose Jaw Warriors earned assists.  Midway through the period, both teams made a goaltender substitution. Ivan Zhigalov of the Sherbrooke Phoenix made 13 saves on 16 shots for Team Red, while Tyler Brennan of the Prince George Cougars faced only four shots, stopping three of them for Team White. Following the goaltending changes, there were no more goals in the period. Team White continued to dominate, as they outshot Team Red 12-5 in the period and 24-9 overall in the game through two periods.

Neither team would score in the third, as Team White held on to a 3-1 victory. In the period, Team White outshot Team Red 15-11, as they finished the game with a 39-20 advantage. Team Red goaltender Reid Dyck of the Swift Current Broncos stopped all 23 shots he faced in the game, while Team White goalie Mason Beaupit of the Spokane Chiefs stopped all 16 shots he saw after coming into the game.

Shane Wright was named Team Red Player of the Game, as he scored the lone goal for the team. Jagger Firkus was named the Team White Player of the Game, as he scored the first goal of the game for his team, while adding an assist on the game winning goal. Attendance for the game at the Kitchener Memorial Auditorium was 5,969.

2022 IIHF World Junior Championship
The 2022 IIHF World Junior Championship was originally held at Peavey Mart Centrium in Red Deer, Alberta and at Rogers Place in Edmonton, Alberta starting on December 26, 2021. The tournament was scheduled to end on January 5, 2022. On December 29, 2021, the IIHF Council cancelled the remainder of the tournament due to the ongoing COVID-19 pandemic and spread of the Omicron variant.

In February 2022, it was announced that the tournament would be replayed from scratch at a later date, with all statistics and results from the first playing being thrown out. The tournament was rescheduled to run from August 9-22, 2022 with all games played at Rogers Place in Edmonton, Alberta.

Twenty-four current and former OHL players were on nine rosters in this tournament, including nine on [[Canada men's national junior ice hockey team
|Canada]], three on Czechia, three on Switzerland, two on Finland, Germany and the United States, and one on Latvia, Slovakia and Sweden.

Canada
The Canadian team had seven current and former OHL players on their roster. The players on the Canadian team who currently played in the OHL were: Brett Brochu, London Knights; Will Cuylle, Windsor Spitfires; Ethan Del Mastro, Mississauga Steelheads; Tyson Foerster, Barrie Colts; Mason McTavish, Hamilton Bulldogs; Ryan O'Rourke, Sault Ste. Marie Greyhounds; Brennan Othmann, Flint Firebirds; and Jack Thompson, Sault Ste. Marie Greyhounds. Former Kitchener Rangers player Donovan Sebrango, who played with the Grand Rapids Griffins of the American Hockey League in 2021-22, was also named to the team.

McTavish, who was named captain of the team, led the tournament in scoring, as he registered eight goals and 17 points in nine games. Foerster scored three goals and six points in seven games, while Othmann had two goals and six points in six games. Cuylle recorded two goals and four points in seven games and Thompson scored a goal and four points in seven games. Sebrango earned two assists in seven games, O'Rourke had one assist in seven games, and Del Mastro was held off the scoresheet in six games. In goal, Brochu did not see any game action.

Canada finished the round robin portion of the tournament with a perfect 4-0-0-0 record, earning twelve points and first place in Group A. In the quarter-finals, Canada defeated Switzerland 6-3, followed by a 5-2 win over Czechia in the semi-finals. In the gold medal game, Canada defeated Finland in overtime by a score of 3-2 to win the tournament.

Czechia
Team Czechia had three OHL players on their roster. The players named to the team were: Pavel Cajan, Kitchener Rangers; Jan Myšák, Hamilton Bulldogs; and Matyas Sapovaliv, Saginaw Spirit.

Myšák was named captain of the team and led Czechia in scoring with four goals and eight points in seven games. Sapovaliv scored two goals and seven games. Cajan appeared in one game, going 0-1-0 with a 3.00 GAA and a .889 save percentage.

Czechia finished the round robin in fourth place in group A, as the team earned a record of 1-0-1-2, earning four points. In the playoff round, Czechia upset the United States in the quarter-finals, winning 4-2. In the semi-final, the team lost to Canada by a 5-2 score. In the bronze medal game, Czechia lost to Sweden by a score of 3-1 to finish in fourth place in the tournament.

Finland
Team Finland had one current OHL player and one former player on their team. Leevi Merilainen of the Kingston Frontenacs was the lone current OHL player. Former Windsor Spitfires player Ruben Rafkin, who moved on to HC TPS of SM-liiga for the 2021-22 season, also made the team.

In seven games, Rafkin earned an assist for Finland. Merilainen posted a 3-1-0 record with a 2.70 GAA and a .893 save percentage in four goals.

Finland finished in second place in Group A during the round robin, earning a record of 2-1-0-1 for eight points. In the quarter-finals, Finland defeated Germany 5-2, followed by a 1-0 shutout win over Sweden in the semi-finals, earning a berth into the gold medal game. In the final game of the tournament, Finland lost to Canada 3-2 in overtime, winning the silver medal and finishing in second place.

Germany
Team Germany had one current OHL player and one former player on their roster. Ryan Del Monte of the Barrie Colts was the lone current player that made the team, while former Owen Sound Attack player Josh Samanski, who played the 2021-22 season with the Straubing Tigers of the DEL was named named to represent his country.

Samanski finished tied for third in team scoring, as he recorded a goal and three points in four games. Del Monte recorded no points in three games.

Germany finished in third place in the Group B standings, earning a record of 2-0-0-2 for six points. In the quarter-finals, Germany lost to Finland 5-2 and was eliminated from the tournament, finishing in sixth place.

Latvia
Latvia had a future OHL player on their roster. Sandis Vilmanis, who was drafted by the Sarnia Sting with the 14th overall selection at the 2022 CHL Import Draft, was named to the team.

In five games, Vilmanis earned an assist.

Latvia finished the round robin in third place in Group A with a 1-0-1-2 record, earning six points. In the quarter-finals, Latvia lost a close game to Sweden by 2-1 score and were eliminated from the tournament. The country finished in seventh place in the tournament.

Slovakia
Team Slovakia had one OHL player on their roster, as Servac Petrovsky of the Owen Sound Attack was named to the team.

Petrovsky finished in second place on the team with two goals, and tied for third place with three points, in four games played.

Slovakia finished the tournament in fifth place in Group A with a record of 0-1-0-3, earning two points. The team did not qualify for the playoff round and finished the tournament in ninth place.

Sweden
Team Sweden had one OHL player on their roster. Oskar Olausson of the Oshawa Generals was the lone OHL player named to the team.

In seven games, Olausson recorded a goal and five points, finishing tied for third in team scoring.

Sweden finished the round robin portion of the tournament with a 3-0-0-1 record, earning nine points and second place in Group B. In the quarter-finals, Sweden defeated Latvia 2-1, earning a berth into the semi-finals. In their semi-final match against Finland, Sweden was shutout 1-0, sending them to the bronze medal game. Sweden earned the bronze medal and third place in the tournament with a 3-1 win over Czechia in their final game.

Switzerland
Team Switzerland named two current OHL players and one former player to their team. Rodwin Dionicio, Niagara IceDogs and Brian Zanetti, Peterborough Petes were the current players named to represent their country. Former IceDogs player Giancarlo Chanton, who finished the 2021-22 season with SC Langenthal of the Swiss League, was also named to the team.

Zanetti recorded two assists in four games, while Dionicio had no points in five games. Chanton also finished the tournament off the scoresheet with no points in five games.

Switzerland finished the round robin with a 1-0-0-3 record, earning three points, and fourth place in Group B. In their quarter-final match, Switzerland lost to Canada 6-3 and was eliminated from the tournament. Switzerland finished in eighth place.

United States
The United States had two players of the OHL on their roster. The players were Andrew Oke of the Saginaw Spirit and Sasha Pastujov of the Guelph Storm.

In five games, Pastujov scored a goal and earned four points. Oke appeared in one game, going 1-0-0 with a 0.00 GAA and a 1.000 save percentage in 40 minutes of play.

The United States finished in first place in Group B with a 4-0-0-0 record, earning 12 points. In the quarter-finals, the USA was upset by Czechia, losing 4-2, to eliminate the team from the tournament. The United States finished in fifth place.

2022 IIHF U-20 Division 1A Championship
The 2022 IIHF U-20 Division 1A Championship was held in Hørsholm, Denmark from December 12 until December 18, 2021. Four current and former OHL players were on three teams in this tournament.

Belarus
Team Belarus had one current and one former OHL player on their roster. The players were Dmitry Kuzmin of the Flint Firebirds and former Kingston Frontenacs player Vitali Pinchuk, who plays for Dinamo Minsk of the KHL.

Pinchuk finished second on team scoring with two goals and nine points in five games, while Kuzmin scored a goal and five points in five games.

During the tournament, Belarus finished in first place with a 5-0-0 record, earning 15 points. The team was promoted to the top division, and will compete at the 2023 IIHF World Junior Championship.

Denmark
Team Denmark had one OHL player on their roster as Kasper Larsen of the Mississauga Steelheads was named to the team.

Larsen appeared in five games in the tournament, scoring two goals and adding two assists for four points.

During the tournament, Denmark finished with a 1-4-0 record, earning three points and finishing in fifth place.

Norway
Team Norway had one OHL player on their roster as Ole Bjorgvik-Holm of the Mississauga Steelheads was named to the team.

Bjorgvik-Holm was named as the captain of the team. He earned two goals and six points in five games.

During the tournament, Norway finished in third place with a 3-2-0 record, earning nine points.

2022 IIHF U-20 Division 1B Championship
The 2022 IIHF U-20 Division 1B Championship was held in Tallinn, Estonia from December 12 until December 18, 2021. One OHL player participated in the tournament.

Ukraine
Team Ukraine had one OHL player on their roster, as Artur Cholach of the Barrie Colts was named to the team.

In five games, Cholach earned eight assists, finishing fourth in team scoring.

During the tournament, Ukraine finished in fourth place with eight points.

References

External links
 www.ontariohockeyleague.com

Ontario Hockey League seasons
OHL